Central Sikh Temple is the first Sikh gurdwara in Singapore. Established in 1912, the temple had relocated several times before moving to its current site at Towner Road at the junction of Serangoon Road in Kallang in 1986 near Boon Keng MRT station.

See also
 Religion in Singapore

References
National Heritage Board (2002), Singapore's 100 Historic Places, Archipelago Press, 
Norman Edwards and Peter Keys (1996), Singapore A Guide To Buildings, Streets, Places, Times Books International,

External links
Central Sikh Temple – official website

Religious organizations established in 1912
Religious buildings and structures completed in 1986
Indian diaspora in Singapore
Kallang
Gurdwaras in Singapore
1912 establishments in Singapore
20th-century architecture in Singapore